Vranë is a village in the municipality of Tuzi, Montenegro. It is located south of  Tuzi town.

Demographics
According to the 2011 census, its population was 1,012.

References

Populated places in Tuzi Municipality
Albanian communities in Montenegro